Funiscala maxwelli is a species of minute sea snail, a marine gastropod mollusk in the family Epitoniidae, the wentletraps.

Distribution 
This species is found in New Zealand.

References

Epitoniidae
Gastropods described in 1930
Taxa named by Harold John Finlay